Conaree Football Club is a Saint Kitts and Nevis football club based in the Upper Conaree neighborhood of Saint Peter Basseterre Parish. The club currently plays in the Saint Kitts and Nevis Premier Division, the top tier of Saint Kitts and Nevis football.

Achievements
Saint Kitts and Nevis Premier Division: 1
 2012–13
Saint Kitts and Nevis National Cup: 2
 2012–13, 2014–15

References

Football clubs in Saint Kitts and Nevis